The Fred P. Lossing Award is awarded by the Canadian Society for Mass Spectrometry to a distinguished Canadian mass spectrometrist. The award is named after Frederick Lossing, a Canadian mass spectrometrist.

The award is made annually since 1994. Recipients of the award receive framed prints of Lake Louise by the local Canmore artist, Marilyn Kinsella.

Recipients 

Past recipients of the award were:

See also

 List of chemistry awards

References 

Academic awards
Canadian science and technology awards
Mass spectrometry awards
Awards established in 1994